Pommeau is an alcoholic drink made in north-western France by mixing apple juice with apple brandy: Calvados in Normandy or lambig in Brittany.

Considered a mistelle, it is generally consumed as an apéritif, or as an accompaniment to melon or blue cheese. It is also popular with a variety of desserts, including any chocolate or apple-based dishes.

Production
Pommeau is made by mixing two-thirds apple must (unfermented apple juice) to one third of one-year-old Calvados. The proportions are chosen to ensure that the resulting mixture has 16–18% alcohol by volume.

The liquid is then put into vats and stirred gently, before being moved to oak barrels, each containing 400 litres, and left to age for around 30 months.

The resulting drink is mahogany in colour with a bright lustre, and has an overall smooth taste, often with vanilla, caramel and butterscotch flavours.

Footnotes

References
 

Cider
Mistelle
French alcoholic drinks